JLT may refer to:

Business 
 Jardine Lloyd Thompson, a British corporation
 Jewish Life Television
 Jumeirah Lakes Towers, a DMCC development in Dubai, United Arab Emirates
 Jumeirah Lakes Towers (Dubai Metro)
 Jumeirah Lakes Towers Free Zone

Music 
 Joe Lynn Turner (born 1951), American singer
 JLT (album), an album by Joe Lynn Turner
 JLT (John Lindberg Trio), a Swedish band

Publications 
 Journal of Lightwave Technology
 Journal of Literary Theory

Other uses 
 JLT-Condor, a British cycling team
 Jump if less than, a branch instruction in computer programming
 2017 JLT Community Series, Australian rules football competition

See also 
Mariategui JLT, Peruvian insurance brokerage company